The Gordon County School District is a public school district in Gordon County, Georgia, United States, based in Calhoun. It serves the communities of Calhoun, Cash, Damascus, Fairmount, New Town, Plainville, Ranger, Red Bud, Resaca, Sonoraville, and Sugar Valley.

Schools
The Gordon County School District has six elementary schools, two middle schools, and two high schools.

Elementary schools
 Belwood Elementary School
 Fairmount Elementary School
 Red Bud Elementary School
 Sonoraville Elementary School
 W. L. Swain Elementary School
 Max V. Tolbert Elementary School

Middle schools
 Ashworth Middle School
 Red Bud Middle School

High schools
 Gordon Central High School
 Sonoraville High School

Closed schools

 Sonoraville middle school

References

External links
 

School districts in Georgia (U.S. state)
Education in Gordon County, Georgia